The 1978 Saskatchewan general election was held on October 18, 1978, to elect members of the Legislative Assembly of Saskatchewan.

The New Democratic government of Premier Allan Blakeney was returned for a third consecutive term with an increased majority in the legislature, and a larger share of the popular vote.

The Progressive Conservative Party of Richard Collver continued to increase its share of the popular vote in this election. They were the only other party to win seats and became the official opposition to the Blakeney government.

Fierce political infighting in the Liberal Party after the resignation of leader David Steuart led to electoral disaster in 1978. The Liberals had lost two of the 15 seats they won in 1975 to by-elections and two more Grits crossed the floor to the Tories prior to the 1978 election. Under the disputed leadership of Ted Malone, the Liberals lost all of the 11 seats they still held in the legislature and more than half the votes it had won in the 1975 election.

Results

Percentages

Ranking

Riding results
Names in bold represent cabinet ministers and the Speaker. Party leaders are italicized. The symbol " ** " indicates MLAs who are not running again.

Northwest Saskatchewan

|-
|bgcolor=whitesmoke|Athabasca
|| 
|Frederick John Thompson2,340
|
|Frank Petit1,180
|
|Henry Coupland498
|
|
|| 
|Frederick John Thompson
|-
|bgcolor=whitesmoke|Cut Knife-Lloydminster
|| 
|Bob Long3,828
|
|Bob Kent3,213
|
|Bill Taylor259
|
|
|| 
|Miro Kwasnica**
|-
|bgcolor=whitesmoke|Meadow Lake
|
|Gord McNeill2,789
|| 
|George McLeod3,016
|
|Colin Campbell537
|
|
|| 
|Gordon James McNeill
|-
|bgcolor=whitesmoke|Redberry
|| 
|Dennis Banda3,325
|
|John Gerich2,916
|
|Peter Bomok491
|
|
|| 
|Dennis George Banda
|-
|bgcolor=whitesmoke|Rosthern
|
|Howard Lucas3,162
|| 
|Ralph Katzman4,708
|
|Bill Patrick964
|
|
|| 
|Ralph Katzman
|-
|bgcolor=whitesmoke|The Battlefords
|| 
|Eiling Kramer4,589
|
|Rod McKenzie2,175
|
|Mervin Zulyniuk1,427
|
|
|| 
|Eiling Kramer
|-
|bgcolor=whitesmoke|Turtleford
|| 
|Lloyd Johnson2,983
|
|Charlie Wells2,188
|
|Pauline H. Cadrain620
|
|
|| 
|Lloyd Emmett Johnson

|-

|style="width: 130px"|NDP
|David Miner
|align="right"|3,432
|align="right"|48.59%
|align="right"|-7.44

|Prog. Conservative
|Harry Zamonsky
|align="right"|2,143
|align="right"|30.34%
|align="right"|+3.79

|Liberal
|Thomas Bidart
|align="right"|1,488
|align="right"|21.07%
|align="right"|+3.65
|- bgcolor="white"
!align="left" colspan=3|Total
!align="right"|7,063
!align="right"|100.00
!align="right"|

Northeast Saskatchewan

|-
|bgcolor=whitesmoke|Cumberland
|| 
|Norm MacAuley2,586
|
|George L. Horne1,254
|
|Leon E. McAuley526
|
|
|| 
|Norman H. MacAuley
|-
|bgcolor=whitesmoke|Kelsey-Tisdale
|| 
|John R. Messer4,031
|
|Neil Hardy3,461
|
|P. Hudson Foga527
|
|
|| 
|John Rissler Messer
|-
|bgcolor=whitesmoke|Kinistino
|| 
|Don Cody4,042
|
|Louis A. Domotor2,661
|
|Robert G. Michayluk706
|
|
|| 
|Arthur Thibault**
|-
|bgcolor=whitesmoke|Melfort
|| 
|Norm Vickar3,102
|
|Bill Warner3,749
|
|John W. Calderwood605
|
|
|| 
|Norman Vickar
|-
|bgcolor=whitesmoke|Nipawin
|
|Irvin G. Perkins3,262
|| 
|Richard Collver3,733
|
|Ron J. Wassill568
|
|
|| 
|Richard Lee Collver
|-
|bgcolor=whitesmoke|Prince Albert
|| 
|Mike Feschuk4,472
|
|Richard E. Spencer3,514
|
|Helga Reydon286
|
|
|| 
|Mike Feschuk
|-
|bgcolor=whitesmoke|Prince Albert-Duck Lake
|| 
|Jerome Hammersmith3,618
|
|Norm Wipf3,569
|
|Colonel J. Archibald660
|
|
|| 
|Norm Wipf
|-
|bgcolor=whitesmoke|Shellbrook
|| 
|George Bowerman3,835
|
|John P. Meagher3,029
|
|Manley R. McLachlan511
|
|
|| 
|George Bowerman

|-

|style="width: 130px"|Prog. Conservative
|Neil Hardy
|align="right"|3,334
|align="right"|48.39%
|align="right"|+5.23

|NDP
|Lars Bracken
|align="right"|3,232
|align="right"|46.91%
|align="right"|-3.36

|Liberal
|Jim Russell
|align="right"|324
|align="right"|4.70%
|align="right"|-1.87
|- bgcolor="white"
!align="left" colspan=3|Total
!align="right"|6,890
!align="right"|100.00
!align="right"|

West Central Saskatchewan

|-
|bgcolor=whitesmoke|Arm River
|
|Donald Leonard Faris3,308
|| 
|Gerald Muirhead3,501
|
|Greg Wensel1,101
|
|
|| 
|Donald Leonard Faris
|-
|bgcolor=whitesmoke|Biggar
|| 
|Elwood L. Cowley4,787
|
|Roy Norris3,270
|
|Lynn Tokle552
|
|
|| 
|Elwood Lorrie Cowley
|-
|bgcolor=whitesmoke|Humboldt
|| 
|Edwin Tchorzewski4,272
|
|John Bajbula2,439
|
|Peter Cline1,065
|
|
|| 
|Edwin Tchorzewski
|-
|bgcolor=whitesmoke|Kindersley
|
|David G. Thomson2,461
|| 
|Bob Andrew2,774
|
|Allan McMillan1,937
|
|
|| 
|Allan Neil McMillan
|-
|bgcolor=whitesmoke|Rosetown-Elrose
|
|Jim Mills3,056
|| 
|Herbert Swan3,587
|
|Calvin W. Fensom1,011
|
|
|| 
|Roy Bailey**
|-
|bgcolor=whitesmoke|Wilkie
|
|Ray Heather2,371
|| 
|Jim Garner2,865
|
|Linda Clifford1,975
|
|
|| 
|Linda Clifford

East Central Saskatchewan

|-
|bgcolor=whitesmoke|Canora
|| 
|Al Matsalla4,258
|
|Eugene Teslia2,647
|
|Joseph F. Matsalla730
|
|
|| 
|Al Matsalla
|-
|bgcolor=whitesmoke|Kelvington-Wadena
|| 
|Neil Byers4,165
|
|Ray Meiklejohn3,366
|
|A. Ben Ferrie521
|
|
|| 
|Neil Erland Byers
|-
|bgcolor=whitesmoke|Last Mountain-Touchwood
|| 
|Gordon MacMurchy4,150
|
|Arnold Tusa3,795
|
|Gill Fontaine385
|
|
|| 
|Gordon S. MacMurchy
|-
|bgcolor=whitesmoke|Melville
|| 
|John Kowalchuk4,072
|
|Glenn Miller3,465
|
|Cecil Headrick901
|
|
|| 
|John Russell Kowalchuk
|-
|bgcolor=whitesmoke|Pelly
|| 
|Norm Lusney3,739
|
|Donald F. Boyd2,130
|
|Rudolph Els760
|
|
|| 
|Norm Lusney
|-
|bgcolor=whitesmoke|Quill Lakes
|| 
|Murray Koskie3,662
|
|W. Brian Wildeman2,251
|
|Mervyn T. Warner919
|
|
|| 
|Murray James Koskie
|-
|bgcolor=whitesmoke|Saltcoats
|| 
|Ed Kaeding3,354
|
|Walter R. Johnson3,265
|
|Gabriel R. Neumeier680
|
|
|| 
|Ed Kaeding
|-
|bgcolor=whitesmoke|Yorkton
|| 
|Randy Nelson4,128
|
|Ray S. Malinowski3,637
|
|Irene Konkin1,036
|
|
|| 
|Randall Neil Nelson

Southwest Saskatchewan

|-
|bgcolor=whitesmoke|Assiniboia-Gravelbourg
|| 
|Allan Engel3,126
|
|Wilf Lethbridge2,331
|
|Roy Nelson2,662
|
|
|| 
|Roy Nelson
|-
|bgcolor=whitesmoke|Maple Creek
|
|Norman Arndt2,327
|| 
|Joan Duncan3,496
|
|W.V. "Fred" Deis1,341
|
|
|| 
|Bill Stodalka**
|-
|bgcolor=whitesmoke|Moose Jaw North
|| 
|John Skoberg4,483
|
|Kerry R. Chow3,579
|
|Gene Chura1,003
|
|
|| 
|John Leroy Skoberg
|-
|bgcolor=whitesmoke|Moose Jaw South
|| 
|Gordon Snyder4,512
|
|Arthur "Bud" Smith2,408
|
|Terry W. Ocrane716
|
|
|| 
|Gordon Taylor Snyder
|-
|bgcolor=whitesmoke|Morse
|| 
|Reg Gross2,587
|
|Art Martens2,203
|
|Jack Wiebe2,024
|
|
|| 
|John Edward Niel Wiebe
|-
|bgcolor=whitesmoke|Shaunavon
|| 
|Dwain Lingenfelter2,778
|
|Jim Lacey2,145
|
|Eiliv "Sonny" Anderson2,385
|
|
|| 
|Eiliv "Sonny" Anderson
|-
|bgcolor=whitesmoke|Swift Current
|
|Spencer Wooff3,288
|| 
|Dennis Ham3,620
|
|Stew Tasche936
|
|
|| 
|Dennis Ham
|-
|bgcolor=whitesmoke|Thunder Creek
|
|D. Hicks2,424
|| 
|Colin Thatcher3,359
|
|Ron Gleim1,270
|
|
|| 
|Wilbert Colin Thatcher

Southeast Saskatchewan

|-
|bgcolor=whitesmoke|Bengough-Milestone
|
|Jim Liggett3,069
|| 
|Bob Pickering3,118
|
|Rod MacDonald1,018
|
|
|| 
|David Lange**
|-
|bgcolor=whitesmoke|Estevan
|
|Norman Blondeau2,703
|| 
|Bob Larter4,376
|
|Paul Bachorcik948
|
|
|| 
|Robert Austin Larter
|-
|bgcolor=whitesmoke|Indian Head-Wolseley
|
|Pat Connolley2,400
|| 
|Doug Taylor2,893
|
|Cyril MacDonald1,943
|
|
|| 
|Cyril Pius MacDonald
|-
|bgcolor=whitesmoke|Moosomin
|
|Fred A. Easton2,614
|| 
|Larry Birkbeck3,353
|
|J. Sinclair Harrison1,964
|
|
|| 
|Larry Birkbeck
|-
|bgcolor=whitesmoke|Qu'Appelle
|
|Greg Willows6,844
|| 
|John Gary Lane7,231
|
|J. Don McCullough1,541
|
|
|| 
|John Gary Lane
|-
|bgcolor=whitesmoke|Souris-Cannington
|
|Dean Fraser2,019
|| 
|Eric Berntson3,739
|
|Gerard Belisle1,170
|
|
|| 
|Eric Arthur Berntson
|-
|bgcolor=whitesmoke|Weyburn
|| 
|Jim Pepper3,517
|
|Glen Dods3,449
|
|Ron Chapdelaine981
|
|
|| 
|James Auburn Pepper

|-

|style="width: 130px"|NDP
|John Chapman
|align="right"|2,918
|align="right"|36.79%
|align="right"|+3.12

|Prog. Conservative
|Grant Devine
|align="right"|2,858
|align="right"|36.03%
|align="right"|-18.49

|Liberal
|Ralph Goodale
|align="right"|2,156
|align="right"|27.18%
|align="right"|+15.37
|- bgcolor="white"
!align="left" colspan=3|Total
!align="right"|7,932
!align="right"|100.00
!align="right"|

Saskatoon

|-
|bgcolor=whitesmoke|Saskatoon Buena Vista
|| 
|Herman Rolfes3,786
|
|Reg Schafer2,343
|
|Doris Serne1,272
|
|
|| 
|Herman Harold Rolfes
|-
|bgcolor=whitesmoke|Saskatoon Centre
|| 
|Paul Mostoway5,246
|
|Harry Baker2,743
|
|Jean Korchin1,453
|
|
|| 
|Paul Peter Mostoway
|-
|bgcolor=whitesmoke|Saskatoon Eastview
|| 
|Bernie Poniatowski4,018
|
|Kimberly Young3,322
|
|Marie Eaton1,257
|
|
|| 
|Glen Penner**
|-
|bgcolor=whitesmoke|Saskatoon Mayfair
|| 
|Beverly Dyck4,328
|
|Donna L. Birkmaier2,394
|
|Dick Reed1,104
|
|
|| 
|Beverly Dyck
|-
|bgcolor=whitesmoke|Saskatoon Nutana
|| 
|Wes Robbins4,739
|
|Grant Devine2,466
|
|John A. Shanks1,080
|
|
|| 
|W. Albert Robbins
|-
|bgcolor=whitesmoke|Saskatoon Riversdale
|| 
|Roy Romanow5,225
|
|Mary Cherneskey2,205
|
|Nestor W. Romaniuk640
|
|
|| 
|Roy Romanow
|-
|bgcolor=whitesmoke|Saskatoon Sutherland
|| 
|Peter Prebble5,007
|
|Bill Lane4,722
|
|Douglas R. Knott1,845
|
|
|| 
|Harold William Lane
|-
|bgcolor=whitesmoke|Saskatoon Westmount
|| 
|John Edward Brockelbank5,651
|
|Peter Shinkaruk2,427
|
|Peter Sydney Groves909
|
|
|| 
|John Edward Brockelbank

Regina

|-
|bgcolor=whitesmoke|Regina Centre
|| 
|Ned Shillington3,767
|
|Keith Jeal1,451
|
|George Exner935
|
|William C. Beeching (Ind.) 45
|| 
|Edward Shillington
|-
|bgcolor=whitesmoke|Regina Elphinstone
|| 
|Allan Blakeney4,390
|
|Christine Whitaker1,250
|
|R. Lawson Wilde596
|
|
|| 
|Allan Blakeney
|-
|bgcolor=whitesmoke|Regina Lakeview
|| 
|Doug McArthur3,351
|
|Ian McPherson1,684
|
|Ted Malone2,366
|
|
|| 
|Edward Cyril Malone
|-
|bgcolor=whitesmoke|Regina North East
|| 
|Walt Smishek4,831
|
|F. Warren Denzin2,248
|
|Del Miller805
|
|Roger D. Annis (Ind.) 36
|| 
|Walter Smishek
|-
|bgcolor=whitesmoke|Regina North West
|| 
|Ed Whelan5,575
|
|Philip Lundeen3,142
|
|J. Culliton Poston1,443
|
|
|| 
|Edward Charles Whelan
|-
|bgcolor=whitesmoke|Regina Rosemont
|| 
|Bill Allen4,524
|
|Florian Vanderlinde2,154
|
|Gerry Bassendowski766
|
|
|| 
|William J. G. Allen
|-
|bgcolor=whitesmoke|Regina South
|
|John Hettema3,114
|| 
|Paul Rousseau3,325
|
|Philip M. Desjardine1,688
|
|
|| 
|Stuart Cameron**
|-
|bgcolor=whitesmoke|Regina Victoria
|| 
|Henry Baker3,729
|
|Andrew G. Shepherd1,594
|
|Glenn Caleval820
|
|
|| 
|Henry Harold Peter Baker
|-
|bgcolor=whitesmoke|Regina Wascana
|| 
|Clint White3,993
|
|Allan W. Wagar2,945
|
|J. Duane Koch1,859
|
|
|| 
|Anthony Merchant**

|-

|style="width: 130px"|NDP
|John Solomon
|align="right"|3,354
|align="right"|47.75%
|align="right"|-7.12

|Liberal
|Ted Malone
|align="right"|2,211
|align="right"|31.47%
|align="right"|+17.27

|Prog. Conservative
|Philip Lundeen
|align="right"|1,460
|align="right"|20.78%
|align="right"|-10.15
|- bgcolor="white"
!align="left" colspan=3|Total
!align="right"|7,025
!align="right"|100.00
!align="right"|

See also
List of political parties in Saskatchewan
List of Saskatchewan provincial electoral districts

References
Saskatchewan Archives Board - Election Results By Electoral Division
Elections Saskatchewan: Provincial Vote Summaries

1978 elections in Canada
1978 in Saskatchewan
1978
October 1978 events in Canada